The Black Legend or the Spanish Black Legend is a theorised historiographical tendency which consists of anti-Spanish and anti-Catholic propaganda. Its proponents argue that its roots date back to the 16th century, when it originally was a political and psychological weapon that was used by Spain's European rivals in order to demonize the Spanish Empire, its people, and its culture, minimize Spanish discoveries and achievements, and counter its influence and power in world affairs.

The Protestant Revolutionary propaganda which was published during the Hispano-Dutch War and the Anglo-Spanish War against the Catholic monarchs of the 16th century, is said to have fostered an anti-Hispanic bias among subsequent historians. Along with a distorted view of the history of Spain and the history of Latin America, other parts of the world in the Portuguese Empire were also affected as a result of the Iberian Union and the Luso-Dutch Wars. This 17th-century propaganda found its basis in real events which occurred during the Spanish colonization of the Americas, which involved atrocities, but it often employed lurid and exaggerated depictions of violence, and it ignored similar behavior by other powers.

Although the existence of a 16th- and 17th-century Spanish black legend is agreed upon by the majority of scholars, aspects of the legend are still debated. Like other black legends, the Spanish black legend combined fabrications, de-contextualization, exaggeration, cherry picking, and double standards with facts. There is disagreement among scholars over whether a biased portrayal of Spanish history continues into the present day.

Historiography and definitions of the Spanish Black Legend
The term "black legend" was first used by Arthur Lévy in reference to biographies of Napoleon, and he primarily used it in the context of two opposing legends, a "golden legend" and a "black legend": two extreme, simplistic, one-dimensional approaches to a character which portrayed him as a god or a demon. "Golden" and "black legends" had been used by Spanish historians and intellectuals with the same meaning in reference to aspects of Spanish history; Antonio Soler used both terms about the portrayal of Castilian and Aragonese monarchs. The use of the term leyenda negra to refer specifically to a biased, anti-Spanish depiction of history gained currency in the first two decades of the 20th century, and is most associated with Julián Juderías. Throughout the 20th and into the 21st century, scholars have offered divergent interpretations of the Black Legend and debated its usefulness as a historical concept.

Origins of the concept of a Spanish Black Legend
At an 18 April 1899 Paris conference, Emilia Pardo Bazán used the term "Black Legend" for the first time to refer to a general view of modern Spanish history:

The conference had a great impact in Spain, particularly on Julián Juderías. Juderías, who worked at the Spanish Embassy in Russia, had noticed (and denounced) the spread of anti-Russian propaganda in Germany, France, and the United Kingdom and was interested in its possible long-term consequences. Juderías was the first historian to describe the "black legend" phenomenon, although he did not yet name it as such, in a book regarding the construction of an anti-Russian black legend. His work, initially concerned with the intentional deformation of Russia's image in Europe, led him to identify the same patterns of narration he detected in the construction of anti-Russian discourse in the dominant historical narrative regarding Spain. Juderías investigated the original sources supporting centuries old claims of Spanish atrocities and other misdeeds, tracing the origin or propagation of the majority to rival emerging powers. In is 1914 book, La leyenda negra y la verdad histórica (The Black Legend and Historical Truth), deconstructs aspects of Spain's image (including those in Foxe's Book of Martyrs). According to Juderías, this biased historiography was marked by acceptance of propagandistic and politically motivated historical sources and has consistently presented Spanish history in a negative light, purposefully ignoring Spanish achievements and advances. In La leyenda Negra, he defines the Spanish black legend as:

Historiographic development of the term

Later writers supported and developed Juderías's critique. In Tree of Hate (1971), historian Philip Wayne Powell argued that the Black Legend was still active in modern history, and plays an active role in shaping USA's relationships and attitudes towards her Latin American neighbors. His book provides examples of what he viewed as divergent treatment of Spain and other powers, and illustrates how this allows for a double narrative that taints Americans' view of Hispanic America as a whole:

In his book Inquisition, Edward Peters wrote:

In his 2002 book Spain in America: The Origins of Hispanism in the United States, American historian Richard Kagan defined the Spanish black legend: 

According to Julián Marías, the creation of the Spanish black legend was not an exceptional phenomenon -similar disinformation and fabrication campaigns have affected most global powers of the past, such as Ottoman Turkey or Russia- but its persistence and integration into mainstream historiography is. For Marías the causes of its durability are:
Overlap of the Spanish Empire with the introduction of the printing press in England and Germany, which enabled the printing of hundreds of pamphlets daily
Religious factors and identification
Substitution of the Spanish intellectual class by another favorable to its former rival (France) after the War of the Spanish Succession, which established a French narrative in Spain 
The unique characteristics of the early modern era's colonial wars and the need for new colonial powers to legitimize claims in now-independent Spanish colonies and the unique, new characteristics of the succeeding empire: the British Empire.

Walter Mignolo and Margaret Greer view the Black Legend as a development of Spain's racialisation of Jewishness in the 15th century. The accusations of mixed blood and loose religiosity of the 15th century, first levelled at Jewish and Moorish conversos both inside Spain and abroad, developed into 16th century hispanophobic views of Spaniards as religious fanatics tainted by association with Judaism. The only stable element they see in this hispanophobia is an element of "otherness" marked by interaction with the Eastern and African worlds, of "complete others", cruelty and lack of moral character, in which the same narratives are re-imagined and reshaped.

Antonio Espino López suggests that the prominence of the Black Legend in Spanish historiography has meant that the real atrocities and brutal violence of the Spanish conquest of the Americas have not received the attention they deserve within Spain. He believes that some Hispanicists:

According to historian Elvira Roca Barea, the formation of a black legend and its assimilation by a nation is a phenomenon observed in all multicultural empires (not just the Spanish Empire). For Roca Barea, a black legend about an empire is the cumulative result of the propaganda attacks launched by different groups: smaller rivals, allies within its political sphere and defeated rivals, and propaganda created by rival factions inside the imperial system; alongside self-criticism by the intellectual elite, and the needs of new powers consolidated during (or after) the empire's existence.

In response to Roca Barea, José Luis Villacañas states that the "black legend" was primarily a factor related to the geopolitical situation of the 16th and 17th centuries. He argues that: 

The conceptual validity of a Spanish black legend is widely but not universally accepted by academics. Benjamin Keen expressed doubt about its usefulness as a historical concept, while Ricardo García Cárcel and Lourdes Mateo Bretos denied its existence in their 1991 book, The Black Legend:

Historical basis of 16th- and 17th-century anti-Spanish propaganda
Eighteenth-century philosopher Immanuel Kant wrote, "The Spaniard's bad side is that he does not learn from foreigners; that he does not travel in order to get acquainted with other nations; that he is centuries behind in the sciences. He resists any reform; he is proud of not having to work; he is of a romantic quality of spirit, as the bullfight shows; he is cruel, as the former auto-da-fé shows; and he displays in his taste an origin that is partly non-European." Thus, semiotician Walter Mignolo argues that the Spanish black legend was closely tied to race in using Spain's Moorish history to portray Spaniards as racially tainted and its treatment of Africans and Native Americans during Spanish colonization to symbolize the country's moral character. That notwithstanding, there is general agreement that the wave of anti-Spanish propaganda of the 16th and 17th centuries was linked to undisputed events and phenomena which occurred at the apogee of Spanish power between 1492 and 1648.

Conquest of the Americas
During the three-century European colonization of the Americas, atrocities and crimes were committed by all European nations according to both contemporary opinion and modern moral standards. Spain's colonization involved massacres, murders, slavery, sexual slavery, torture, rape and other atrocities, especially in the early years, following the arrival of Christopher Columbus in the Caribbean. However, Spain was the first in recorded history to pass laws for the protection of indigenous peoples. As early as 1512, the Laws of Burgos attempted to regulate the behavior of Europeans in the New World forbidding the ill-treatment of indigenous people and limiting the power of encomenderos—landowners who received royal grants to indigenous communities and their labor. In return, the laws established a regulated regime of work, provisioning, living quarters, hygiene, and care for the natives. The regulation prohibited the use of any form of punishment by the landowners and required that the huts and cabins of the Indians be built together with those of the Spanish. The laws also ordered that the natives be taught the Christian religion and outlawed bigamy.

In July 1513, four more laws were added in what is known as Leyes Complementarias de Valladolid 1513, three related to Indian women and Indian children and another more related to Indian males. In 1542 the New Laws expanded, amended and corrected the previous body of laws in order to ensure their application. However, this body of legislation represents one of the earliest examples of humanitarian laws of modern history.

Although these laws were not always followed, they reflect the conscience of the 16th century Spanish monarchy about native rights and well-being, and its will to protect the inhabitants of Spain's territories. These laws came about in the early period of colonization, following abuses reported by Spaniards themselves traveling with Columbus. Spanish colonization methods included the forceful conversion of indigenous populations to Christianity. The "Orders to the Twelve" Franciscan friars in 1523, urged that the natives be converted using military force if necessary. On par with this sentiment, Juan Ginés de Sepúlveda argued that the Indian's inferiority justified using war to civilize and Christianize them. He encouraged enslavement and violence in order to end the barbarism of the natives. Bartolomé de las Casas, on the other hand was strictly opposed to this viewpoint—claiming that the natives could be peacefully converted.

Such reports of Spanish abuses led to an institutional debate in Spain about the colonization process and the rights and protection of indigenous peoples of the Americas. Dominican friar Bartolomé de las Casas published Brevísima relación de la destrucción de las Indias (A Short Account of the Destruction of the Indies), a 1552 account of the alleged atrocities committed by landowners and officials during the early period of colonization of New Spain (particularly on Hispaniola). De las Casas, son of the merchant Pedro de las Casas (who accompanied Columbus on his second voyage), described Columbus's treatment of the natives in his History of the Indies. His description of Spanish actions was used as a basis for attacks on Spain, including in Flanders during the Eighty Years' War. The accuracy of de las Casas's descriptions of Spanish colonization is still debated by some scholars due to supposed exaggerations. Although historian Lewis Hanke thought that de las Casas exaggerated atrocities in his accounts, Benjamin Keen found them more or less accurate. Charles Gibson's 1964 monograph The Aztecs under Spanish Rule (the first comprehensive study of sources about relations between Indians and Spaniards in New Spain), concludes that the demonization of Spain "builds upon the record of deliberate sadism. It flourishes in an atmosphere of indignation which removes the issue from the category of objective understanding. It is insufficient in its understanding of institutions of colonial history." However this view has been broadly criticised by other scholars such as Keen, who view Gibson's focus on legal codes rather than the copious documentary evidence of Spanish atrocities and abuses as problematic.

In 1550, Charles I tried to end this debate by halting forceful conquest. Philip II tried to follow in his footsteps with the Philippine Islands, but previous violent conquest had shaped colonial relations irreversibly. This was one of the lasting consequences that led to the dissemination of the Black legend by Spain's enemies.

The treatment of indigenous peoples during Spanish colonization was used in propaganda works of rival European powers in order to foster animosity towards the Spanish Empire. De las Casas' work was first cited in English in the 1583 work , at a time when England was preparing to join the Dutch Revolt on the side of the anti-Spanish rebels.

Historians have noted that the mistreatment and exploitation of indigenous peoples was committed by all European powers which colonized the Americas, and such acts were never exclusive to the Spanish Empire. The revaluation of the Black Legend on contemporary historiography has led to a reassessment of non-Spanish European colonial records in recent years as the historiographical evaluation of the Impact of Western European colonialism and colonisation continues to evolve. According to scholar William B. Maltby, "At least three generations of scholarship have produced a more balanced appreciation of Spanish conduct in both the Old World and the New, while the dismal records of other imperial powers have received a more objective appraisal."

War with the Netherlands 
Spain's war with the United Provinces and, in particular, the victories and atrocities of the Castilian nobleman Fernando Álvarez de Toledo, 3rd Duke of Alba, contributed to anti-Spanish sentiment. Sent in August 1567 to counter political unrest in a part of Europe where printing presses encouraged a variety of opinions (especially against the Catholic Church), Alba seized control of the publishing industry; several printers were banished, and at least one was executed. Booksellers and printers were prosecuted and arrested for publishing banned books, many of which were part of the Index Librorum Prohibitorum.

After years of unrest in the Low Countries, the summer of 1567 saw renewed violence in which Dutch Calvinists defaced statues and decorations in Catholic monasteries and churches. The March 1567 Battle of Oosterweel was the first Spanish military response to the unrest, and the beginning of the Eighty Years' War. In 1568 Alba had prominent Dutch nobles executed in Brussels' central square, sparking anti-Spanish sentiment. In October 1572, after Orange forces captured the city of Mechelen, its lieutenant attempted to surrender when he heard that a larger Spanish army was approaching. Despite efforts to placate the troops, Fadrique Álvarez de Toledo (son of the governor of the Netherlands and commander of the duke's troops) allowed his men three days to pillage the city; Alba reported to King Philip II that "not a nail was left in the wall". A year later, magistrates were still attempting to retrieve church artifacts which Spanish soldiers had sold elsewhere.

This sack of Mechelen was the first of a series of events known as the Spanish Fury; several others occurred over the next several years. In November and December 1572, with the duke's permission, Fadrique had residents of Zutphen and Naarden locked in churches and burnt to death. In July 1573, after a six-month siege, the city of Haarlem surrendered. The garrison's men (except for the German soldiers) were drowned or had their throats cut by the duke's troops, and eminent citizens were executed. More than 10,000 Haarlemers were killed on the ramparts, nearly 2,000 burned or tortured, and double that number drowned in the river. After numerous complaints to the Spanish court, Philip II decided to change policy and relieve the Duke of Alba. Alba boasted that he had burned or executed 18,600 persons in the Netherlands, in addition to the far greater number he massacred during the war, many of them women and children; 8,000 persons were burned or hanged in one year, and the total number of Alba's Flemish victims can not have fallen short of 50,000.

The Dutch Revolt spread to the south in the mid-1570s after the Army of Flanders mutinied for lack of pay and went on the rampage in several cities, most notably Antwerp in 1576. Soldiers rampaged through the city, killing, looting, extorting money from residents and burning the homes of those who did not pay. Christophe Plantin's printing establishment was threatened with destruction three times, but was spared each time with payment of a ransom. Antwerp was economically devastated by the attack; 1,000 buildings were torched, and as many as 17,000 civilians were raped, tortured and murdered. Parents were tortured in their children's presence, infants were slain in their mother's arms, wives were flogged to death before their husbands' eyes. Maastricht was besieged, sacked and destroyed twice by the Tercios de Flandes (in 1576 and 1579), and the 1579 siege ended with a Spanish Fury which killed 10,000 men, women and children. Spanish troops who breached the city walls first raped the women, then massacred the population, reputedly tearing people limb from limb. The soldiers drowned hundreds of civilians by throwing them off the bridge over the river Maas in an episode similar to earlier events in Zutphen. Military terror defeated the Flemish movement, and restored Spanish rule in Belgium.

The propaganda created by the Dutch Revolt during the struggle against the Spanish Crown can also be seen as part of the Black Legend. The depredations against the Indians that De las Casas had described were compared to the depredations of Alba and his successors in the Netherlands. The Brevissima relación was reprinted no less than 33 times between 1578 and 1648 in the Netherlands (more than in all other European countries combined). The Articles and Resolutions of the Spanish Inquisition to Invade and Impede the Netherlands accused the Holy Office of a conspiracy to starve the Dutch population and exterminate its leading nobles, "as the Spanish had done in the Indies." Marnix of Sint-Aldegonde, a prominent propagandist for the cause of the rebels, regularly used references to alleged intentions on the part of Spain to "colonize" the Netherlands, for instance in his 1578 address to the German Diet.

In recent years, Prof. dr. Maarten Larmuseau of KU Leuven has used genetic testing to examine a prevalent belief regarding the Spanish occupation

The memory of the large scale rape of local women by Spanish soldiers lives on to such extent that it is popularly believed that their genetic imprint can be seen today, and that most men and women with dark hair in the area descend from children conceived during those rapes. The study found no greater Iberian genetic component in the areas occupied by the Spanish army than in surrounding areas of northern France, and concluded that the genetic impact of the Spanish occupation, if any, must have been too small to survive until the present era. However, the study makes it clear that the absence of a Spanish genetic imprint in modern populations was not incompatible with the occurrence of mass sexual violence. The frequent murder of Flemish rape victims by Spanish soldiers, the fact rape does not always lead to fertilisation, and the reduced survival possibilities of the illegitimate offspring of rape victims would all militate against significant Iberian genetic contribution to modern populations. Larmuseau considers the persistence of the belief in a Spanish genetic contribution in Flanders to be the fruit of the use of Black Legend tropes in the construction of Dutch and Flemish national identities in the 16th-19th century, giving prominence to the idea of the Spanish armies' cruelty in collective memory.

In an interview with a local newspaper, Larmuseau compared the persistence in popular memory of the actions of the Spanish with the lesser attention given to the Austrians, the French and the Germans who also occupied the Low Countries and participated in violence against their inhabitants.

Origin of the early modern Black Legend

Anti-Spanish sentiment appeared in many parts of Europe as the Spanish Empire grew. In the Habsburg realm, Spain was a dominant power in a union encompassing present-day Belgium, Luxembourg, the Netherlands, Burgundy and much of Italy. Iberian (principally Castilian) troops marched along the Spanish Road from Italy to Germany to fight on Dutch and German battlefields.

During the Eighty Years' War, propaganda depicted Spaniards as bloodthirsty barbarians. During the following centuries, anti-Spanish stereotypes circulated widely (especially in English-, Dutch- and German-speaking parts of Europe). The propaganda depicted exaggerated versions of the evils of Spanish colonial practices and the Spanish Inquisition.

William S. Maltby, regarding Spain in the Netherlands:

Italy
Sverker Arnoldsson of the University of Gothenburg supports Juderías' hypothesis of a Spanish black legend in European historiography and identifies its origins in medieval Italy, unlike previous authors (who date it to the 16th century). In his book The Black Legend: A Study of its Origins, Arnoldsson cites studies by Benedetto Croce and Arturo Farinelli to assert that Italy was hostile to Spain during the 14th, 15th and 16th centuries and texts produced and distributed there were later used as a base by Protestant nations.

Arnoldsson's theory on the origins of Spain's black legend has been criticized as conflating the process of black-legend generation with a negative view (or critique) of a foreign power. The following objections have been raised:
 The Italian origin of the earliest writings against Spain is an insufficient reason to identify Italy as the origin of the black legend; it is a normal reaction in any society dominated by a foreign power. 
 The phrase "black legend" suggests a tradition (non-existent in Italian writings) based on a reaction to the recent presence of Spanish troops (which quickly faded).
 In 15th- and 16th-century Italy, critics and Italian intellectual admirers of Spain (particularly Ferdinand II of Aragon) coexisted.

Edward Peters states in his work "Inquisition":According to William S. Maltby, Italian writings lack a "conducting theme": a common narrative which would form the Spanish black legend in the Netherlands and England. Roca Barea agrees; although she does not deny that Italian writings may have been used by German rivals, the original Italian writings "lack the viciousness and blind deformation of black-legend writings" and are merely reactions to occupation.

Germany
Arnoldsson offered an alternative to the Italian-origin theory in its polar opposite: the German Renaissance. German humanism, deeply nationalistic, wanted to create a German identity in opposition to that of the Roman invaders. Ulrich of Hutten and Martin Luther, the main authors of the movement, used "Roman" in the broader concept "Latin". The Latin world, which included Spain, Portugal, France, and Italy, was perceived as "foreign, immoral, chaotic and fake, in opposition to the moral, ordered and German."

In addition to the identification of Spaniards with Jews, heretics, and "Africans", there was an increase in anti-Spanish propaganda by detractors of Emperor Charles V. The propaganda against Charles was nationalistic, identifying him with Spain and Rome although he was born in Flanders, spoke Dutch but little Spanish and no Italian at the time, and was often at odds with the pope.

To further the appeal of their cause, rulers opposed to Charles focused on identifying him with the pope (a view Charles had encouraged to force Spanish troops to accept involvement in his German wars, which they had resisted). The fact that troops and supporters of Charles included German and Protestant princes and soldiers was an extra reason to reject the Spanish elements attached to them. It was necessary to instill fear of Spanish rule, and a certain image had to be created. Among published points most often highlighted were the identification of Spaniards with Moors and Jews (due to the frequency of intermarriage), the number of conversos (Jews or Muslims who converted to Christianity) in their society, and the "natural cruelty of those two."

England 
England played a role in the spread and use of the Spanish Black Legend during colonial times, but it is also agreed that, no matter how much the English might have added to it, the origin of the narrative was not in England and reached the islands only after war and conflicting interest.

In A Comparison of the English and Spanish Nation (1589), Robert Ashley writes:

Antonio Pérez, the fallen secretary of King Philip, fled to France and then England, where he published attacks on the Spanish monarchy under the title Relaciones (1594). The English referred to these books to justify privateering and wars against the Spanish. A violently hispanophobic preacher and pamphleteer, Thomas Scott, would echo this sort of epithet a generation later, in the 1620s, when he urged England to war against "those wolvish Antichristians" instead of accepting the "Spanish Match."

Sephardic Jews

According to Philip Wayne Powell, the criticism which was spread by the Jews who were expelled by Spain's Catholic monarchs was an important factor in the spread of anti-Spanish sentiment (particularly religious stereotypes).

Islamophobia and antisemitism

This origin combines elements of German origin with proof of the anti-Hispanic narrative which existed prior to the 16th century, along with a large number of parallelisms between anti-Spanish and anti-Semitic narratives which existed in modern Europe, and it is one of the narratives which is gathering the largest amount of support. According to this view, the Spanish Black Legend was created by transferring the already created "character" of the "cruel, gold lusty Jew" onto the Spanish nation. Since the narrative was familiar, the stereotype was accepted, and the identification of Spaniards and Jews was already mainstream in Europe due to the long history of coexistence between both communities in Iberia, at a time when the Jews had been expelled from most of Europe, the Black Legend was promptly believed and assimilated in Central Europe.

According to Elvira Roca Barea, the Spanish Black Legend is a variant of the antisemitic narratives which had already been circulated in medieval-era Northern, Central and Southern European nations since the 13th century. Roca Barea views the hostility towards the Spanish Empire as leading to a Hispanophobic narrative which instrumentalised Spain's historical role as a meeting point of Christianity, Islam and Judaism as a tool of propaganda. In 1555, after the expulsion of the Spanish Jews, Pope Paul IV described Spaniards as "heretics, schismatics, accursed of God, the offspring of Jews and Moors, the very scum of the earth". This climate would facilitate the transfer of antisemitic and anti-Muslim stereotypes to Spaniards. This case has three main sources of proof, the texts of German Renascence Intellectuals, the existence of the black legend narrative in Europe prior to the conquest of America, and the similarity of the stereotypes to other stereotypes which were attributed to Judaism by anti-Semitic Europeans and the stereotypes which the Black Legend attributed to the Spanish.

Texts which identify Spaniards with "heretics" and "Jews" were first written in Germany in the 14th century, and various pieces of 15th- and 16th-century anti-Spanish propaganda are almost line by line copies of prior anti-semitic works. For example, the famous account of the mistreated Native Americans killing their oppressors by pouring melted gold onto their heads is an exact rewording of the scene which is described in the anti-semitic poem the Siege of Jerusalem. It also suggests that the deep anti-semitism which is espoused in Luther's works may have served a double function, nationalistic and anti Spanish as well as religious, if the identification of both functions was already in circulation.

Martin Luther correlated "the Jew" (who was detested in Germany at the time) with "the Spanish", whose power was increasing in the region. According to Sverker Arnoldsson, Luther:
Identified Italy and Spain with the papacy, even though the Pontifical States and Spain were enemies at the time 
Ignored the coexistence (including intermarriage) of Christians and Jews in Spain
Conflated Spain and Turkey out of fear of an invasion by either power.

In 1566, Luther's conversations were published. Among many other similar affirmations, he is quoted as saying: 
References to Spanish as "bad Christians", "Jews", "Moors" or racialized references associating said ancestry with lack of moral or general inferiority can be found uninterruptedly in black legend sources and political propaganda since the Middle Ages until well into the contemporary period.

Distribution 
Proponents such as Powell, Mignolo and Roca Barea allege that the Spanish Black Legend prevails in most of Europe, especially Protestant nations and France, and the Americas. There is, however, no significant trace of it in the Muslim world or Turkey despite the almost seven centuries of sustained warfare in which Spain and the Islamic world were engaged. Historian Walter Mignolo has argued that the Black Legend was closely tied to ideologies of race, both in the way that it used the Moorish history of Spain to depict Spaniards as racially tainted, and in the way that the treatment of Africans and Native Americans during Spanish colonial projects came to symbolize their moral character.

The first Puritan settlers were deeply hostile to Spain, seeing themselves as the Protestant advance guard that would free the Indians from Spanish oppression and cruelty. Prominent among these Puritan authors was Cotton Mather, who translated the Bible into Spanish for distribution among the Indians of New Spain. After its independence, the United States soon became a territorial rival of Spain in America, both on the border with New Spain, and in Florida, the Mississippi or in New Orleans, a port that the Americans wanted to export their products from. The enlightened and liberal ideas that had entered the United States in the eighteenth century, joined their sympathies for the new republics emerging to the south, increasing anti-Spanish sentiment. This hostility reached its zenith during the Spanish-American War, when the propaganda machine of Hearst and Pulitzer, used by their newspaper empires, had an enormous influence on public opinion in their country. The hispanophobic speeches heard in Congress during the conflict were so insulting that they led to massive protests in Spain. 

It was a confrontation for the right to control and exploit the riches of the American lands and peoples and that, in general, did not affect the lower classes. Around 1800, the ideas of the Enlightenment, with its anticlericalism, its skepticism to authorities, and its support by Masonic lodges, had been enthusiastically embraced among American intellectuals. According to Powell, these ideas were mixed with the black legend, that is, with the identification of Spain as a "horrible example" of obscurantism and backwardness, as an enemy of modernity. Indeed, he claims that the American wars of independence were to some degree civil wars, with the rebels led by minorities of Creoles.

With this background, Powell argues that the rebels were able to use the black legend as a propaganda weapon against the metropolis. Countless manifestos and proclamations were published quoting and praising Las Casas, poems and hymns describing the depraved nature of the "Spaniards", letters and pamphlets designed to advance the patriotic cause. One of the first was the peruvian Juan Pablo Vizcardo y Guzmán in his Carta dirigida a los españoles americanos por uno de sus compatriotas, accusing the metropolis of the serious exploitation suffered, summarizing the situation as «ingratitude, injustice, servitude and desolation». Another example is one of the great heroes of American independence, Simón Bolívar, an admirer of Las Casas, whose texts he would use profusely, blamed the Spanish for all the sins committed in America (by Creoles and non-Creoles) in the last 200 years, making the Creoles the victims, the "colonized". He would also be one of the first to appeal for the theft of American wealth and claim its return.

This anti-Spanish mentality was maintained during the 19th century and part of the 20th among the liberal elites, who considered "de-Hispanization" the solution to national problems. The historian Powell affirms that as a consequence of denigrating Spanish culture, it has been possible to denigrate their own, of which the first is a part, both in their own eyes and in foreign eyes. In addition, the fact would have produced a certain lack of roots among the American peoples, by rejecting part of their own.

At the same time, on the beginning of the 19th century, a school of liberal historians appeared in Spain and France who began to speak of the Spanish decline, considering the Inquisition responsible for this economic and cultural decline and for all the ills that afflicted the country. Other European historians would take up the subject later, maintaining this position in some authors until today. The reasoning stated that the expulsion of the Jews and the persecution of the converts would have led to the impoverishment and decline of Spain, in addition to the destruction of the middle class. In 1867 Joaquín Costa had also raised the issue of Spanish decline. Both he and Lucas Mallada wondered if the fact was due to the Spanish character. He was joined by French and Italian sociologists, anthropologists and criminologists, who spoke more of "degeneration" than decadence, and later other Spaniards such as Rafael Salillas or Ángel Pulido. Pompeu Gener blamed Spanish decadence on religious intolerance and Juan Valera on Spanish pride. These ideas passed into literature with the Generation of '98, in texts by Pío Baroja, Azorín and Antonio Machado: «[Castilla...] a piece of the planet crossed by the wandering shadow of Caín»; reaching in some extremes to masochism and the inferiority complex. Joseph Pérez relates this rejection of one part of his own history (the expulsion of the Jews, the Inquisition, the conquest of America) and the idealization of another (Al-Andalus) with similar movements in Portugal and France.

Also, after the Unification of Italy, many Italian historians tended to narrate in a negative way the time when part of the Italian peninsula had formed a dynastic union with Spain. In particular, Gabriele Pepe denounced what in his eyes had been the plunder and corruption of southern Italy "under the Spanish". This view only began to change in the last third of the 20th century, thanks to a series of congresses and authors such as Rosario Villari and Elena Fasano Guarini.

One of the works with the most themes of the black legend has been the novel Noli me tangere, by the Filipino physician and writer José Rizal, in which strong criticism of the Spanish administration is expressed (especially the Spanish clergy in the Philippines) for which a series of hoaxes and prejudices were propagated, full of exaggerations and half-truths, against the Spanish friars, who were accused of using religion as a mask to disguise their malice, of promoting sexual violations, of being the cause of corruption (wanting to remain in power through Spanish institutions) and having lost their vocation as parish priests and academics because of their economic ambition. Being this a book in which the Spanish were negatively described and cited by their enemies to legitimize the American and Japanese conquest of the Philippines. This prejudges were because Rizal had lived in Europe for long periods and was well acquainted with European and Enlightenment culture (where a rationalist liberalism that was highly critical of the monarchy was proliferating in Spain), including the work of Voltaire, Schiller, Manzoni, Verdi, among other disseminators of the black legend that influenced his anti-colonial nationalism and liberal positions with an anticlerical tendency. The origins of Rizal's prejudices may also be due to problems with the Dominicans over the administration and payment of the rent of the Laguna hacienda, in addition to the low grades he obtained, compared to those he had at the Jesuit Municipal Athenaeum, which he would narrate in a painfully funny way in his novel El Filibusterismo. After the Noli-Fili Law (which requires that all universities teach courses on José Rizal and that his works Noli me tangere and El filibusterismo be read to students) this narrative was consolidated in the Philippine academic environment, despite protests from the Catholic Church in the Philippines for misrepresenting the country's social situation and the facts concerning the Spanish-Filipino clergy in colonial times.

Then, Mariano Ponce and his book Cuestión Filipina: Una exposición histórico-crítica de hechos relativos a la guerra de la independencia, was serialized in Keikora Nippo and translated to Japanese and published as a book in Tokyo in 1901, also was to Chinese under the title Feilubin duli Zhanshi, then published in Shanghai in 1902, and republished in 1913, it was, according to Rebecca Karl, "perhaps the most influential text in post-1902 Chinese interpretations of the importance of the Philippine revolution in the world and in China". It is ironic to note that Ponce's book was never published in the Philippines and is little known, however Ponce's stay in Japan propagated, in Asian public opinion, the idea that the Philippine revolution was a just cause and spreading the black legend for that purpose. Also, he had an idealistic and romantic vision of oriental solidarity. Ponce maintained close relations with the group of Asian political exiles who, fleeing from European colonialism, sought a reference in Meiji society and, at the same time, support for their nationalist aspirations, and among them, especially with the founder of the Kuomintang, Sun Yat-sen. So, the Spanish black legend narrative was publicized along Eastern civilization. Between Filipinos and Japanese, he said, affinities of geography and race created bonds of friendship and ensured interests similar to those that existed between Europeans or Americans. In that respect, he echoed the pan-Asianism prevailing in Japanese empire at the time. "Asianism" was a theme of Philippine thought even before Ponce came to Japan. People like Rizal and Pedro Paterno situated the Philippines in a "Malay" cultural world and established racial and cultural affinities that linked the Philippines not only to Malaysia, but to mainland Southeast Asia and much of Asia and Oceania. This discourse on racial, linguistic and historical affiliation was an anti-colonial and universalizing proposal that defended for the "Filipinos" a high and differentiated culture, connected with the "civilizations of the world" and therefore deserving of the benefits of autonomy and equality within the Spanish imperial order.

Because of this Filipino campaign of propaganda in Asia, Chinese historians like Tang Tiaoding, declared that: "If one looks for the truth about the Philippines in the history books of the Spanish, he will not doubt that the country is ignorant and filthy". Saying in 1902, at the end of the Philippine-American War on the middle of the suppression of nationalists insurgents, that a narrative called "White People's History" was being developed to attempt to legitimize American conquest based on narratives that the Filipinos were primitive and ignorant that they should be civilized. All these books would have been written by white people (liberal Filipinos Criollos and Anglo-Americans), where half-truths and falsehoods were diluted and confused the amateurs on the subject, which gave indications of a plan of cultural indoctrination, through of the conquest of Philippine education by Western elites (Americans and Filipino collaborators, mostly white people) and its Modernist discourses. However, Tang himself was influenced by the narrative of Mariano Ponce, who was a representative of the First Philippine Republic and a member of the Propaganda Movement, which is why he also contributed to spreading the Spanish black legend in China and East Asia in general, seeing to the Spaniards as ambitious and calculating, not very different from the rest of the whites, inherently vicious, not distinguishing the Spanish colonial policy from that of the rest of the colonial powers during New Imperialism.

The leading historians of the United States in the 19th century, Francis Parkman, George Bancroft, William H. Prescott, and John Lothrop Motley, would also write History tinged with black legend, texts that remain important in later American historiography.Example of this is The Philippine Islands, 1493–1898, important source of Philippine history for non-Spanish speakers that has been criticized by modern historians, notably Glòria Cano.

Continuance of the Black Legend in the modern era 

Historians disagree on whether the Black Legend exists as a genuine factor in current discourse around Spain and its history. In recent years a group of historians including Alfredo Alvar, Ricardo García Cárcel and Lourdes Mateo Bretos have argued that the Black Legend does not currently exist beyond Spanish society’s own perception of how the world views Spain’s legacy. According to Carmen Iglesias, the Black Legend consists of negative traits which the Spanish people see in themselves and is shaped by political propaganda.

The view of the group around García Cárcel is echoed by Benjamin Keen, writing in 1969. He argues that the concept of the Black Legend cannot be considered valid, given that the negative depiction of Spanish behavior in the Americas was largely accurate. He further claims that whether a concerted campaign of anti-Spanish propaganda based on imperial rivalry ever existed is at least open to question.

Henry Kamen argues that the Black Legend existed during the 16th century but has disappeared in contemporary perceptions of Spain. However, other authors, like Elvira Roca Barea, Tony Horowitz and Philip Wayne Powell, have argued that it still affects the manner in which Spain is perceived, and that it is brought up strategically during diplomatic conflicts of interest as well as in popular culture to draw attention away from the negative actions of other nations. Historian John Tate Lanning argued that the most detrimental impact of the Black Legend was to reduce the Spanish colonization of the Americas (and the resulting culture that emerged) to "three centuries of theocracy, obscurantism, and barbarism." In 2006, Tony Horowitz argued in The New York Times that the Spanish Black Legend affected current U.S. immigration policy.

Venezuelan case has been studied by Gilberto Ramón Quintero Lugo in his book «La Leyenda Negra y su influjo en la historiografía venezolana de la Independencia» (April 2004).

In her 2016 book exploring “empire-phobia” as a recurring sociopolitical phenomenon in human history, Elvira Roca Barea argues that the unique persistence of the Spanish Black Legend beyond the end of the Spanish Empire is tied to a continued anti-Spanish and anti-Catholic sentiment in traditionally Protestant European countries:

José Luis Villacañas, in his 2019 response to Roca Barea, labels her work as "populist national-Catholic propaganda" and accuses her of minimising Spanish atrocities in the Americas along with those of the Inquisition. He argues that, for all intents and purposes, the Black Legend has no meaning outside the context of 17th century propaganda, although he recognises that certain negative stereotypes of Spain may have persisted during the Franco regime.

García Cárcel criticises Roca Barea’s position as adding to a long tradition of Spanish society’s insecurities about how other countries perceive it. On the other hand, he also criticizes Villacañas’s discourse as being heavily ideological in the opposite direction and systematically indulging in presentism. García Cárcel calls for an analysis of Spain’s history that renounces both “narcissism and masochism” in favor of nuanced awareness of its “lights and shadows”.

Other proponents of the continuity theory include musicologist Judith Etzion and Roberto Fernandez Retamar, and Samuel Amago who, in his essay "Why Spaniards Make Good Bad Guys" analyzes the persistence of the legend in contemporary European cinema.

Economics 

 Luis Español argues that direct references to constructs which date back to the Black Legend were published in the British and Canadian media during the Turbot War of 1994 between Spain and Canada.
 Elvira Roca Barea argues that referring to Spain as part of the PIGS or "GIPSY"  group of countries is a recourse to anti-Catholic and hispanophobic stereotypes in order to protect the financial interests of Protestant countries.

Political 

 Philip Wayne Powell, writing in 1971, considered the Black Legend to be the root of contemporary diplomatic problems between Latin American and the United States, making the case for this in his book The Tree of Hate: Propaganda and Prejudices Affecting Relations with the Hispanic World. The view of the Black Legend affecting the present-day United States' immigration policy has gained supporters in the current political climate.
 Powell stated that Spain's past ownership of about half of the United States' land was unknown by most Americans, affecting the way in which the Latin American population and cultures are treated, as well as the linguistic debate there.
 Spanish foreign minister Josep Borrell stated that he sees a re-emergence of the Black Legend across Europe in the way the Catalonian issue has been covered, especially by English-speaking press.

Education and popular culture 

 In 1944, the American Council of Education released a report on anti-Hispanism in school textbooks, identifying a large number of basic errors, inexactitudes and biased portrayals. It concluded that "The abolition of the Black Legend and its effects in our interpretation of Latin American life is one of our main problems in the educational and intellectual aspect, as well as in the political sphere", and urged for textbooks' biases and errors to be fixed. However, according to Powell, in 1971 all the core errors were still in the majority of school materials.
 Today, the existence of the Black Legend can also be seen in the Philippines and in the minds of Filipinos. The image of the Spanish empire is usually bad here, first of all, because of the conquest of Philippine lands. Although the Philippines was occupied by both Spain and the United States and Japan, only the Spanish were often seen as oppressors who kept the society in the backwardness of a servile mentality and ignorance of religious fanaticism, while the Americans were portrayed as liberators of the nation in the process of building a national identity against the interference of other powers.

Race

 In Tree of Hate, Powell argued that the Black Legend contributed to racist depictions of Hispanic and Latino Americans in the media of the United States:
 There is also the implacably tyrannical, hardhearted hacendado and the slinky, treacherous Mexican "greaser"; these gringo versions of Spanish depravity have had considerable popularity with Hollywood scenarists and the writers of horse operas. The following description is typical: "She sent for the Mexican at once, and the man came in a few moments, a venomous looking specimen of his race, slinking, yellow-eyed, with nicotine ingrained to his very soul."

White legend
The label "White Legend" (Leyenda Blanca) is used to describe a historiographic approach which presents an uncritical or idealized image of Spanish colonial practices. Some authors consider this to be the result of taking attempts to counter the bias of the Black Legend too far, whereas others consider it to have developed independently. Miguel Molina Martinez describes this legend as a characteristic of the Nationalist Spanish historiography which was propagated during the regime of Francisco Franco, a regime which associated itself with the imperial past and couched it in positive terms. Molina Martinez points to the classic text of Spanish Americanists during the Franco period, Rómulo Carbia's Historia de la leyenda negra hispanoamericana, as a work with a strong ideological motivation which frequently fell into arguments which could be qualified as part of the White Legend, while also giving more current examples of the trope. Some, such as Benjamin Keen, have criticized the works of John Fiske and Lewis Hanke as going too far towards idealizing Spanish history. While recognising the general merit of Hanke's work, Keen suggests that the United States' contemporary imperial ventures in the Caribbean and the Philippines had led him to idealise the Spanish Empire as an analogy for American colonialism. He further argues that the proponents of the White Legend focus on Spanish legal codes protecting the Indigenous population, while ignoring the copious documentary evidence that they were widely ignored.

Luis Castellvi Laukamp accuses Elvira Roca Barea of "transforming the Black Legend into the White Legend" in her influential 2016 work, Imperofobia y Leyenda Negra, in which she claims that Spain confronted the other "not with racist theories but with [protective] laws". Castellvi Laukamp points out that not only did the Spanish Laws of the Indies include racism from the beginning, but slavery continued in Spanish colonies in the Americas until 1886. He further takes issue with claims that Spanish colonies' high level of mestizaje (biological and cultural mixing of the European and Indigenous population) demonstrates the absence of racism in the Spanish Empire. Castellvi Laukamp quotes from contemporary sources showing that Indigenous women were treated as spoils of war and subject to racialised sexual slavery and subordination and demonstrates the discriminatory racial stereotypes deployed against black and other non-white women in the colonial period.

Dominican Historian Esteban Mira Caballos argues that the Black and White legends form part of a single unity, which he calls a "Great Lie". He goes on to describe the way the Black Legend is instrumentalised to support the White Legend:

The "White Legend" or the "Pink Legend" (Sp: Leyenda Rosa) may also refer to the propaganda which was circulated within Spain by Philip II and his descendants, propaganda which claimed that his actions in the Netherlands and America were religiously motivated, so his own patrimony would be preserved. This propaganda was intended to foster the image that Spain was ruled by a prudent and pious monarch, and control the unrest that was generated by his aggressive policies and his wars in the Netherlands.

See also

Anti-Catholicism
Antisemitic canard
Atrocity propaganda
Black armband view of history, a similar concept in Australia
Black Legend of the Spanish Inquisition
Colonial mentality
Cultural depictions of Philip II of Spain
Hispanophobia
Historical revisionism
Population history of indigenous peoples of the Americas
Stereotypes of Hispanic and Latino Americans in the United States
Stereotypes of Jews

References

Further reading

 Ardolino, Frank. Apocalypse and Armada in Kyd's Spanish Tragedy (Kirksville, Missouri: Sixteenth Century Studies, 1995).
 Arnoldsson, Sverker. "La Leyenda Negra: Estudios Sobre Sus Orígines," Göteborgs Universitets Årsskrift, 66:3, 1960
 
 
 Español Bouché, Luis, "Leyendas Negras: Vida y Obra de Julian Juderías", Junta de Castilla y Leon, 2007.
 Gibson, Charles. The Black Legend: Anti-Spanish Attitudes in the Old World and the New. 1971.
 
 Griffin, Eric. "Ethos to Ethnos: Hispanizing 'the Spaniard' in the Old World and the New," The New Centennial Review, 2:1, 2002.
 Hadfield, Andrew. "Late Elizabethan Protestantism, Colonialism and the Fear of the Apocalypse," Reformation, 3, 1998.
 Hanke Lewis. The Spanish Struggle for Justice in the Conquest of America. 1949.
 Hanke, Lewis. Bartolomé de Las Casas: Bookman, Scholar and Propagandist. 1952.
 
 
 Kamen, Henry, Empire: How Spain Became a World Power, 1492-1763. New York: HarperCollins. 2003. 
 Keen, Benjamin, "The Black Legend Revisited: Assumptions and Realities", Hispanic American Historical Review 49, no. 4 (November 1969): 703–19.
 Keen, Benjamin, "The White Legend Revisited: A Reply to Professor Hanke's 'Modest Proposal,'" Hispanic American Historical Review 51, no. 2 (May 1971): 336–55.
 
 Lock, Julian. "'How Many Tercios Has the Pope?' The Spanish War and the Sublimation of Elizabethan Anti-Popery," History, 81, 1996.
 Maltby, William S., The Black Legend in England. Duke University Press, Durham, 1971, .
 Maura, Juan Francisco. "La hispanofobia a través de algunos textos de la conquista de América: de la propaganda política a la frivolidad académica". Bulletin of Spanish Studies 83. 2 (2006): 213–240.
 Maura, Juan Francisco. ¿"Cobardía, crueldad y oportunismo español?: algunas consideraciones sobre la 'verdadera' historia de la conquista de la Nueva España". Lemir (Revista de literatura medieval y del Renacimiento) 7 (2003): 1–29. 
 Mignolo, W. D. (2007). "What does the Black Legend Have to do with Race?" Rereading the Black Legend: The Discourses of Religious and Racial Difference in the Renaissance Empires, 312–24.
 Powell, Philip Wayne, Tree of Hate: Propaganda and Prejudices Affecting United States Relations with the Hispanic World. Basic Books, New York, 1971, .
 
 Sanchez, M.G., Anti-Spanish Sentiment in English Literary and Political Writing, 1553–1603 (Phd Diss; University of Leeds, 2004)
 Schmidt, Benjamin, Innocence Abroad. The Dutch Imagination and the New World, 1570–1670, Cambridge U.P. 2001, 
 

Anti-Catholicism in the United Kingdom
Anti-Catholicism in the United States
Anti-Spanish sentiment
Black propaganda
History of the Philippines (1565–1898)
History of the Philippines (1898–1946)
Political forgery
Spanish–American War
Spanish Empire
Spanish Inquisition
Propaganda legends